The High Society are a glam rock group from Birmingham, England, formed in 2006 by Matt "Maxi" Browne and Martyn "The Nelsta" Nelson following the breakup of their previous band King Adora. They have one release to date, the self-titled  EP The High Society, released in 2009. Following the reunion of King Adora, the group's future is unknown.

History

Formation (2006–2008)
Following the breakup of their previous band, King Adora, Matt Browne and Martyn "The Nelsta" Nelson formed the band initially known as The Bombshell AC's, with a sound similar to their previous group except edging more to the glam metal sound of the 80's, in early 2006 eventually changing their name to The High Society playing their first live show soon after. Rounding up the band's line-up was Beat Union bassist and Farse guitarist Ade Preston on guitar, bassist Glen Jones and drummer Ash Sheehan. Both Martyn and Ade left the group replaced by Danny Boy and Topper. The group would play shows sporadically over the years while also hinting at the possibility of relocating the band to London.

Debut EP, King Adora reunion (2009–present)

On 12 June 2009 the group released the self-titled EP The High Society, which included a recorded version of the song Can't Stay Away performed at the last King Adora show, released in 2009 on iTunes with a limited pressing of 100 copies sold during live shows. Ade Preston left the group as well as bassist Glen Jones who was replaced by Rex Roulette.

In August 2009, the group announced they were to play an American label showcase at the O2 Academy in Islington on 7 September.

In January 2010, King Adora announced that they were to return scheduling two gigs in April, a show in their home town Birmingham as well as a show in London. With Browne's involvement with King Adora the group's future is unknown.

Band members

Current lineup
 Matt "Maxi" Browne – Vocals
 Danny Boy – Guitar
 Topper – Lead Guitar
 Rex Roulette – Bass
 Ash Sheehan – Drums

Previous members
 Martyn "The Nelsta" Nelson – lead guitar
 Ade Preston – guitar
 Glen Jones – bass

Discography

EPs

References

External links
The High Society official site
 

English glam rock groups
English glam metal musical groups
English hard rock musical groups
Musical groups from Birmingham, West Midlands
Musical groups established in 2006